Kai Kodukkum Kai is a 1984 Indian Tamil-language film directed by Mahendran, starring Rajinikanth and Revathi. It is an extended version of Munithayi written by Eeswarachandra – the third segment of the 1976 Kannada anthology film Katha Sangama. Rajnikanth, who played the antagonist role in Munithayi, played the lead role in this film. The film was produced by Vijayakumar and R. Vijayachandran.

Plot 

Kaalimuthu marries Seetha, the girl he loves after much denial from his elder brother. Seetha is blind and is raped a man Pannaiyar who has a weakness for women and addiction to sex. Pannaiyar even though married lusts after looking at Seetha and rapes her in the absence of Kaalimuthu, her husband. The climax is interesting twist as to what happens when Kaalimuthu decides to forgive Pannaiyar for his crime.

Cast 
 Rajinikanth as Kaalimuthu
 Revathi as Seetha Kaalimuthu
 Rajyalakshmi as Mangamma
 Ranganath as Periyapannai
 V. S. Raghavan as Kaalimuthu's brother
 Sowcar Janaki as Kaalimuthu's sister-in-law
 Y. G. Mahendran
 Poornam Viswanathan
 Thengai Srinivasan
 Chinni Jayanth
 Kumarimuthu
 Veeraraghavan

Production 
Actor Vijayakumar decided to produce a film with Rajinikanth as the lead actor. Rajinikanth suggested Mahendran be the director. The film was an extended version of Munithayi, the third segment of the 1975 Kannada anthology film Katha Sangama by Puttanna Kanagal. Rajinikanth who played the antagonist role in the original played the lead in the remake. Mahendran wrote the screenplay with slight changes in the script. When Revathi was approached by Mahendran to portray the blind girl Seetha, she accepted after being impressed by the script. In preparation for portraying the character, she walked around her house blindfolded. Revathi refused to expose her skin for the scene where Seetha is raped; respecting her wishes, Mahendran shot the scene "with care", prioritising Revathi's comfort. Vijayakumar was not satisfied with the climax, as he felt fans would not accept Seetha getting raped. However, Mahendran refused to change the climax that the original film had. A duet sequence had to be included in the film due to pressure from others.

Soundtrack 
The soundtrack and background score were composed by Ilaiyaraaja while lyrics were written by Vaali, Pulamaipithan, Na. Kamarasan, Madukkur Kannan and Gangai Amaran.

Release and reception 
Kai Kodukkum Kai was released on 15 June 1984. Ananda Vikatan said the film "teetered between Rajini-ism and Mahendran-ism". Similar comments were made by Kalki. The film ran for over 100 days in theatres.

References

Bibliography

External links 
 

1980s Tamil-language films
1984 films
Films about rape in India
Films directed by Mahendran (filmmaker)
Films scored by Ilaiyaraaja
Films with screenplays by Mahendran (filmmaker)
Tamil remakes of Kannada films